There are several protected areas of Guyana. In 2011, the National Protected Areas System (NPAS) was established. As of 2020, about 8.4% of the country is protected.

Nature reserves and parks 
 Iwokrama International Centre. 1996. 3,716 km2.
 Kaieteur National Park. 1929. 630 km2.
 Kanashen Amerindian Protected Area. 2007. 6,486 km2.
 Kanuku Mountains Protected Area. 2011. 6,110 km2.
 Shell Beach Protected Area. 2011. 32 km2.

Urban Parks 
Protected Areas Trust also protects the following urban parks:
 Joe Vieira Park
 Guyana Botanical Gardens
 Guyana National Park
 Guyana Zoo

References

External links
 Protected Areas Trust

Environment of Guyana
Protected
Guyana
 
Protected areas